CyberArk is a publicly traded information security company offering identity management. The company's technology is utilized primarily in the financial services, energy, retail, healthcare and government markets. CyberArk is headquartered in Newton, Massachusetts. The company also has offices throughout the Americas, EMEA, Asia Pacific and Japan.

History 

CyberArk was founded in 1999 by Alon N. Cohen and current CEO Udi Mokady who assembled a team of security engineers who implemented the digital vault technology.

In June 2014, CyberArk filed for an Initial public offering (IPO) with the Securities and Exchange Commission, listing 2013 revenues of $66.2 million. CyberArk became a public company the same year, trading on the NASDAQ as CYBR. In the years following its IPO, CyberArk made a string of security acquisitions.

 2015: CyberArk acquired the private Massachusetts-based company Viewfinity, which specialized in privilege management and application control software, for $39.5 million.
 2017: CyberArk acquired Massachusetts-based cybersecurity company Conjur Inc., which secured access for software development and IT teams that are building cloud-based software, for $42 million.
 2018: CyberArk acquired assets of Boston-based cloud security provider Vaultive. Twenty Vaultive employees, most from the company's research and development team, joined CyberArk.
2019: CyberArk acquired identity startup Idaptive for $70 million.
On February 12, 2020 CyberArk said it had over 5,300 customers.

In May 2022, CyberArk announced the launch of ‘CyberArk Ventures’ a collection to fund Cybersecurity Technology start-ups. The organisation gained $30 million from global investments to empower the new venture, with the aim of funding disruptive technologies. CyberArk aligned with investors including Venrock, Yl Ventures, Team8 Capital and Merlin ventures and has announced the joint investments in Dig Security, Enso Security and Zero Networks.

References 

Companies listed on the Nasdaq
Computer companies of the United States
Software companies based in Massachusetts
Software companies of Israel
Software companies of the United States
1999 establishments in the United States
1999 establishments in Massachusetts
Software companies established in 1999
Companies established in 1999
Companies based in Massachusetts